Ruhle Road Stone Arch Bridge was a historic stone arch bridge located at Malta in Saratoga County, New York. It was constructed about 1873 and spanned the Ballston Creek.   The arch measured 26 feet from the creek surface and 23.5 feet between the abutments.

It collapsed in 1993 and was replaced in 2001 with the Ruhle Road Lenticular Metal Truss Bridge.

It was listed on the National Register of Historic Places in 1988 and delisted in 2004.

References

Bridges completed in 1873
Bridges in Saratoga County, New York
Road bridges in New York (state)
Former National Register of Historic Places in New York (state)
Stone arch bridges in the United States